Sancai Tuhui, compiled by Wang Qi and his son Wang Siyi, is a Chinese leishu encyclopedia, completed in 1607 and published in 1609 during the late Ming dynasty, featuring illustrations of subjects in the three worlds of heaven, earth, and humanity. The work contains a large number of posthumous and contemporary depictions of Chinese Emperors.

Title
The title of this encyclopedia has been variously translated into English as "Illustrations of the Three Powers", "Collected Illustrations of the Three Realms", "Pictorial Compendium of the Three Powers", and others; in the original title, "Sancai" refers to the three realms of "heaven, earth, and man", and "Tuhui" means "collection of illustrations".

Description
This encyclopedia is organized into 106 chapters in 14 categories (astronomy, geography, biographies, history, biology, and such), with text and illustrations for the articles. Reproductions of this encyclopedia are still in print in China.

While it contains some inaccurate or mythological articles (for example, the articles on the horseshoe crab and the crane), it also distinguished itself from the common "everyday encyclopedias" (riyong leishu) at that time by being accurate in some other articles (for example, accurate depictions of the Japanese, Korean and Vietnamese people's clothing, and a very accurate world map (the Shanhai Yudi Quantu).

See also
Song Yingxing
Wakan Sansai Zue - A Japanese encyclopedia inspired by the Chinese Sancai Tuhui

References

External links

 http://www.ncl.edu.tw/rarebook/oldcol.htm
 https://web.archive.org/web/20050316001242/http://www.lib.ntu.edu.tw/dbs/dbs/ref/BOOKchin.htm
 https://archive.today/20031217211032/http://www.xhlib.net/xinshu02.htm (World Maps in the Ming Dynasty from the Shanghai Xuhui District Library)
 http://www.ihp.sinica.edu.tw/~ihpcamp/pdf/92year/wang-cheng-hua-2.pdf - Wang, Cheng-hua.  , pp. 8–9.
 http://horseshoecrab.sinica.edu.tw/15th.htm
 https://web.archive.org/web/20051128075412/http://www.fhk.gov.tw/fhkbook/hist/hist.asp-sq_no=45.htm
 http://www.rice.edu//fondren/erc/projects/jingban/ (A map from the Chinese encyclopedia)

Ming dynasty literature
Chinese encyclopedias
Leishu
1609 books

17th-century encyclopedias